Jeremiah Robinson was an Irish soccer player during the 1920s and 1930s. He was also known as "Sam".

Robinson was a tough defender during this era in the League of Ireland and was part of the Bohemians team of 1927/28 who won every trophy on offer that season - League of Ireland, FAI Cup, Shield and Leinster Senior Cup.

He won 2 full international caps for the Irish Free State, making his debut against Belgium in 1928.

He was the brother of fellow Bohemian, Christy.

Honours
League of Ireland: 1
 Bohemians - 1927/28
FAI Cup: 1
 Bohemians - 1928
League of Ireland Shield: 1
 Bohemians - 1928

References

External links

Republic of Ireland association footballers
Irish Free State international footballers
League of Ireland players
Bohemian F.C. players
Year of birth missing
Year of death missing
Irish Free State association footballers
Association football defenders